WMUD may refer to:

WMUD-LP, radio station
Willie Miller Urban Design